Charmaine may refer to:
Charmaine, a character in What Price Glory?
"Charmaine" (song), the theme song for the 1926 adaptation of What Price Glory
"Charmaine" (rap song), a 2006 song by Plan B
Charmaine (musician), a Christian pop singer

People with the given name
Charmaine Bingwa, Zimbabwean-Australian actor, writer and director
Charmaine Cree, Australian Paralympic athlete
Charmaine Dean (born 1958), statistician from Trinidad, president of Statistical Society of Canada
Charmaine Dragun (1978–2007), Australian broadcast journalist and presenter
Charmaine Li (born 1983), Chinese actress
Charmaine Marchand-Stiaes, American politician
Charmaine Scotty, Nauruan politician
Charmaine Sheh (born 1975), Chinese actress
Charmaine Fong (born 1980), Chinese singer and actress

See also

Charlaine

English feminine given names